Tjetju was an ancient Egyptian official at the end of the Old Kingdom or in the First Intermediate Period. He held a series of high titles making him to one of the most influential people at the royal court. He most important title was that of the vizier. He was also overseer of the treasuries, overseer of the six big houses, overseer of the two granaries and overseer of all royal work of the king.

Tjetu is known from his modest tomb at Saqqara, built close to the much bigger tomb complexes of Mereruka and Kagemni. Tjetju was priest at the pyramid temple of king Pepi I. Therefore he is often dated under the latter king. Others date him to the First Intermediate Period.

References

Literature 

Ancient Egyptian viziers
Overseer of the treasury